Club Atlético Peñarol (English: Peñarol Athletic Club) —also known as Carboneros, Aurinegros, and (familiarly) Manyas— is a Uruguayan sports club from Montevideo. The name "Peñarol" comes from the Peñarol neighbourhood on the outskirts of Montevideo. Throughout its history the club has also participated in other sports, such as basketball and cycling. Its focus has always been on football, a sport in which the club excels, having never been relegated from the top division.

In international competition, Peñarol is the third-highest Copa Libertadores winner with five victories and shares the record for Intercontinental Cup victories with three. In September 2009, the club was chosen as the South American Club of the Century by the IFFHS .

Apart from men's football, other active sports sections of Peñarol are rugby union, futsal, women's football, and athletics.

History

Origins

On September 28, 1891, employees of the Central Uruguay Railway Company established the Central Uruguay Railway Cricket Club (CURCC) of Montevideo, with the purpose of stimulating the practice of cricket, rugby football and "other male sports" (literal from the Spanish).

The Central Uruguay Railway company had operated in Uruguay since 1878, with 118 employees, 72 British, 45 Uruguayan and one German. The club's first president was Frank Henderson, who remained in that position until 1899.

In 1892, the CURCC shifted its focus from cricket and rugby to association football. The football club's first game was against a team of students from the English high school and ended with a 2–0 victory. In 1895, Uruguayan footballer Julio Negrón was chosen as the team's first non-British captain.

First titles

In 1900 the CURCC was one of four charter members of the Uruguay Association Football League, making its debut in official competition on 10 June against Albion and winning 2–1. The club won its first Uruguayan championship that year, repeating in 1901, 1905 and 1907. In 1906 Charles W. Bayne took over the railroad, and refused to sponsor the football team due to financial and work issues. Conflict between the company and the football club led to the severance of their relationship in 1913.

In 1908, the club left the Uruguayan league after the league rejected their request to replay a game with F.C. Dublín. CURCC had lost 2–3 on the road, and believed their poor showing was due to refereeing mistakes caused by pressure from rabid home fans. As a sign of good faith, Nacional also retired from the league, since both teams agreed that "Los Partidos se ganan en la Cancha", or "matches are won on the pitch". Back in competition the following year, relations between the CUR and the club became frostier after fans burned a train car used for rival teams.

A year after the club's 1911 Uruguayan championship, the club attempted reforms to its policies. Proposals included greater participation by non-CUR players and a name change to "CURCC Peñarol". In June 1913, the proposals were rejected; the company wanted to distance itself from the club's local reputation. The railroad company, decided to separate the " foot-ball " section of the team from the company on Saturday 13 December 1913. That is when Peñarol was founded. The following day it was the first time a " Clasico " was officially played between Nacional and Peñarol.

CURCC kept playing football in the amateurism until it was dissolved on 22 January 1915 and donated all their trophies to the British Hospital of Montevideo, not to Peñarol.

C.A. Peñarol

On 12 March 1914, Peñarol replaced CURCC's spot in the Uruguayan Football League after its foundation in 1913. A request submitted to the Uruguayan Football League two days later and approved the following day. During its first years Peñarol was not successful, although a new stadium (Las Acacias) opened on 19 May 1916. The club won its first two league titles in 1918 and 1920.

In November 1922 the Asociación Uruguaya de Fútbol (AUF) disqualified Peñarol because the club played an exhibition game with Racing, an Argentine club affiliated with Asociación Amateurs de Football (a dissident association established in 1919 that rivalized with the official entity, AFA). Peñarol and other clubs then organised a new league, the Uruguayan Football Federation (FUF), and the club won the 1924 championship. The league was short-lived; Peñarol won the 1926 Copa del Consejo Provisorio, triggering a merger between the AUF and the FUF.

First European tour

In 1927, Peñarol made its first tour to Europe, playing a total of 19 matches against teams from Germany, Switzerland, Austria, Spain, Czechoslovakia and France. The tour extended from April to June. The first match of the tour was vs. the Vienna combined, which Peñarol lost by 3–1. The Uruguayan team then played Bayern Munich (1–2), SpVgg (1–2), Hertha BSC (Berlin) (0–1). The first win was v. Eintracht Frankfurt (3–1). The lineup for that match was Luis Biscardi, Demis D’Agosto, José Benincasa, Pascual Ruotta, Gildeón Silva, Antonio Aguerre, Ladislao Pérez, Antonio Sacco, Pablo Terevinto, Peregrín Anselmo, Antonio Campolo. Goals were scored by Suffiotti (2) and Ruotta. The tour continued in Switzerland, v. Young Fellows (1–0), Rapid Vienna (0–5), then facing Sparta Prague (losing by 1–0).

On June 5, Peñarol played its first game in Spain v. FC Barcelona, losing by 1–5. The second test was played one day later, finishing in a tie (1–1). Other notable games of the tour were the two tests v. Atlético Madrid (5–2 and 4–3).

Peñarol played a total of 19 matches in 80 days (6 in Spain, 5 in Germany, 4 in Switzerland and 1 in Czechoslovakia and France), totalizing 7 wins, 4 draws and 8 losses. The team scored 32 goals and received 33, with Antonio Sacco being the topscorer with 9 goals.

After its first European tour in 1927, Peñarol won the Uruguayan championship in 1928 and 1929; the following year, the club defeated Olimpia 1–0 in its first game at the Centenario Stadium in Montevideo.

Consolidation

In 1932, Peñarol and River Plate played the first game of the professional era. Peñarol won the first Uruguayan professional championship with 40 points, five more than runners-up Rampla Juniors. After placing second in 1933 and 1934, the club won four consecutive league tournaments between 1935 and 1938; they also won the 1936 Torneo Competencia.

The club stayed in second place until 1944, when Peñarol again won the Uruguayan Championship (defeating Nacional in a two-game final, 0–0 and 3–2). In 1945 the club retained the title, with Nicolás Falero and Raúl Schiaffino the top goal scorers of the playoffs with 21 apiece. Peñarol was again victorious in 1949, four points ahead of runner-up Nacional with Óscar Míguez the top scorer.

After placing second in 1950, Peñarol won the Uruguayan Championship the following year; this was also the start of the Palacio Peñarol's four-year construction. During the 1950s, the club also won national championships in 1953, 1954, 1958 and 1959.

International success

Their 1959 championship qualified Peñarol for the recently created Copa Libertadores, an international competition then known as the Copa de Campeones de América. Peñarol won the first two tournaments, beating Olimpia of Paraguay in 1960 and Palmeiras of Brasil in 1961. That year the club won its first Intercontinental Cup, defeating Benfica of Portugal 2–1 in the third game. Peñarol won three more league titles (1960, 1961 and 1962), for five consecutive championships. Béla Guttmann coached the team in 1962.

After a quiet year in 1963, Peñarol won the Uruguayan Championship in 1964 and 1965 and the Copa Libertadores in 1966, defeating River Plate 4–2. That year the club won its second Intercontinental Cup, defeating Real Madrid 2–0 in Centenario Stadium and Santiago Bernabéu. During the next few years the club won national championships in 1967 and 1968 and the Intercontinental Champions' Supercup in 1969 (a tournament with South American Intercontinental Cup winners). Peñarol had the longest undefeated run in Uruguayan league history: 56 games, from 3 September 1966 to 14 September 1968. Copa Libertadores all-time top scorer Alberto Spencer played for Peñarol at this time.

In 1970 the club again reached the Libertadores final again, losing to Estudiantes de La Plata. The club set a tournament record for greatest goal difference, defeating Valencia of Venezuela 11–2. With Fernando Morena as the team's star, the club won the Uruguayan championship for three consecutive years, from 1973 to 1975. After placing second in 1976 and 1977, Peñarol won again in 1978. That year, Morena set two records: most goals scored in a Uruguayan season (36) and most goals scored in a single game (seven, against Huracán Buceo on 16 July). The 1970s ended with another championship in 1979. Morena was top scorer in the Uruguayan tournament six straight times, and top Copa Libertadores scorer in 1974 and 1975.

After beginning the 1980s with a third-place finish in 1981, Peñarol won the Uruguayan Championship with Fernando Morena and Rubén Paz (the tournament's top scorer). The next season the club again won the Copa Libertadores, defeating Cobreloa of Chile 1–0 on a goal from Fernando Morena (the tournament's top scorer with seven goals) in the game's final minutes. Later that year the club won the Uruguayan championship and its third Intercontinental Cup, defeating Aston Villa 2–0.

Despite financial problems during the 1980s, Peñarol won the national championship in 1985 and 1986, and a fifth Copa Libertadores in 1987. The club defeated América de Cali 1–0 with a goal by Diego Aguirre in the final seconds of extra time, when a tie would have gone to the Colombians on the goal differential. It was the third Copa Libertadores won by Peñarol at the Nacional de Chile, following victories in 1966 and 1982.

Peñarol celebrated its hundredth anniversary in 1991, despite a controversy ignited by archrivals Nacional concerning Peñarol's 1913 name change. With Pablo Bengoechea and the young Antonio Pacheco on the team and Gregorio Pérez behind the bench, Peñarol again won the Uruguayan championship five straight times (1993–97). The club also reached the Copa Conmebol final in 1994 and 1995, rounding out the century with a national championship in 1999 (defeating Nacional 2–1 in the final, despite Julio Ribas on the bench).

The next year, Peñarol lost the Uruguayan championship final against Nacional; many of the team's players were jailed after a tournament fight. Peñarol won the national championship again in 2003 for Diego Aguirre, defeating Nacional in the final. The club did not win another national title until the 2009–10 season, when it won the Clausura tournament with 14 victories in 15 games (12 of them in a row). In the Clausura final, Peñarol defeated Nacional 2–1. The championship qualified the team for the Libertadores 2011, where Peñarol reached the final with Santos.

The club was congratulated on its 120th anniversary in September 2011 by presidents Joseph Blatter, Michel Platini. and Nicolás Leoz.

Crest and colors

Badge

Throughout the club's history minor changes have been made to its symbols, but it has kept its original colors. The shield and flag were designed by architect Constante Facello and consist of five black stripes, four yellow stripes and eleven yellow stars on a black background (representing the eleven players).

Uniforms

Since its founding, Peñarol's colors have been yellow and black. They were inspired by the Rocket locomotive designed by George Stephenson, which won an award in 1829.

The first jersey was a plain shirt, divided into four square sections which alternated black and yellow. A variant had two vertical halves (black on the right and black-and-yellow stripes on the left), with black shorts and socks. Peñarol's official jersey (black and yellow stripes) dates back to 1911 and has been worn almost continuously, with only slight variations.

Inspiration for Romanian club FC Brașov
Peñarol inspired Romanian club FC Brașov to change its official colors in December 1966 from white and blue to yellow and black. The change came following a tournament of Romania's Olympic football team in Uruguay. After a match with Peñarol, Csaba Györffy, player at FC Brașov, received from Peñarol's captain Alberto Spencer the shirt with which he played. Györffy was fascinated by the combination of yellow and black stripes and decided at the return in the country to wear the shirt during his training sessions with the team. The decision to change the colors of the club was taken by coach Silviu Ploeşteanu, who considered that, in the new colors, the team will be seen better on the field. Since January 1967, the team from Brașov has yellow-black as official colors, recalling Peñarol.

Kit evolution

Kit manufacturers

Notes

Facilities

Stadium

Peñarol's first stadium was the José Pedro Damiani, also known as Las Acacias. It was bought in 1913 and inaugurated on 19 April 1916 with a 3–1 victory over Nacional. The stadium's gate was that of the former Estadio Pocitos, Peñarol's first stadium where the first goal in the history of the FIFA World Cup was scored in 1930.

The stadium is in the Marconi neighbourhood of Montevideo. Because Peñarol was not allowed to play there due to security concerns, the club home ground was the city owned Estadio Centenario. Opened on 18 July 1930, the Centenario stadium is in Parque Batlle and can hold 65,235.

Las Acacias has acted as the home ground for all Peñarol's Youth Teams.

The name of their newest stadium is Campeón del Siglo (CDS), opening in March 2016 and which has been the home ground ever since.

Palacio Peñarol

The Palacio Peñarol, in downtown Montevideo, is the club's headquarters and basketball stadium. It was opened on 21 June 1955; and is located. The Palacio has  in addition to basketball, it is home the club's museum and offices. After the October 2010 collapse of the Cilindro Municipal, the Palacio Peñarol became an important venue for Uruguayan basketball.

Complejo Deportivo Washington Cataldi
The Complejo Deportivo Washington Cataldi, commonly known as Los Aromos, is a training ground for the main team. In Villa Los Aromos of Barros Blancos, in the Canelones department, Los Aromos was bought in 1945; under the direction of architect José Donato, it was built in two years.

Centro de Alto Rendimiento
For the club's 118th anniversary, the Centro de Alto Rendimiento was inaugurated. The new facility, which opened on 28 September 2009, includes five football pitches, a weight room and a gymnasium with artificial turf.

Frank Henderson School 
The Frank Henderson School, named in honor of the club's first president, is a few kilometers away from the Centro de Alto Rendimiento. It was built to develop the club's young players, and houses those who come from other areas.

Supporters

In Uruguayan football, loyalty to Peñarol or Nacional divides the country. The clubs are evenly matched, and have a large fan base. Many surveys of public opinion have been conducted, but none have been conclusive. In 1993 the Factum consulting firm reported that Peñarol was the favorite team of 41 percent of football fans, while 38 percent supported Nacional. Factum conducted another survey in 2006, confirming its previous results: Peñarol with 45 percent and Nacional with 35 percent.

MPC Consultants surveyed 9,000 Uruguayans; Peñarol had 45 percent of the supporters, and Nacional 38 percent. An online survey on the webpage Sportsvs.com showed Nacional with 50.35 percent and Peñarol with 49.45 percent.

Since its formation, Peñarol's barra brava has been involved in violence against other clubs and the Uruguayan police. Incidents provoked by these fans have cost Peñarol 31 points since 1994; the penalties cost the team three tournaments (Apertura 1994, Clausura 1997 and Clausura 2002).

Fan club
In 2010 the club attempted to increase its fan base to improve its sustainability. During Clausura 2010 promotions were offered, marketing managers hired and the peñas (local fan clubs) encouraged. The campaign was successful; in February 2013 the club had over 62,000 members, the largest fan club in Uruguay.

Rivalries

The Uruguayan Derby between Peñarol and Nacional goes back to 1900, the oldest football rivalry outside the British Islands. The first game ever played between Nacional and CURCC was on 15 July 1900 and ended 2–0 in favor of CURCC. CURCC was ahead at first, but Nacional caught up during the late 1910s. Nacional took the lead by fourteen games in 1948, and would not surrender it until the late 1970s (except briefly in 1968). Since then, Peñarol has been the leader; its longest lead was 26 games in January 2004. Including the amateur and professional eras, league and friendly games, the teams have met 511 times in the past with 182 victories to Peñarol, 166 to Nacional and 163 ties.

A notable game for Peñarol fans is occurred on 9 October 1949 in the Uruguayan Cup first round, and is known as the Clásico de la fuga (the "escape derby"). At the end of the first half Peñarol was leading 2–0, but at halftime Nacional decided not to return. While Peñarol fans believe that Nacional did not want to be defeated by a Peñarol team known as the Máquina del 49 ("Machine of 49"), Nacional supporters claim it was a protest against poor officiating.

On 23 April 1987 for a friendly game, Peñarol and Nacional were tied 1–1 with 22 minutes remaining when three Peñarol players (José Perdomo, José Herrera and Ricardo Viera) were ejected after a foul and subsequent protests. Peñarol then had to face a full Nacional team with only eight players on the pitch. With eight minutes remaining Diego Aguirre set up Jorge Cabrera, who scored the winning goal. This win by the aurinegro was known as the Clásico de los 8 contra 11 (the "8 against 11 derby").

Peñarol and Nacional have faced each other in the final game of the Uruguayan Championship thirteen times, with Peñarol winning eight. The most recent was in 2018, when Peñarol won the championship 2–1.

Manyas: The Movie
In early October 2011 Manyas: The Movie, a documentary about Peñarol's fans, was released in Uruguay. Produced by Kafka Films and Sacromonte and directed by Andrés Benvenuto, the film features interviews with fans, football journalists, psychologists and politicians. Manyas: The Movie was deemed of cultural interest by the Culture and Education Ministry of Uruguay and of ministerial interest by Uruguay's Ministry of Tourism and Sport. The film had the most-successful premiere of any Uruguayan film, selling 13,000 tickets during its first weekend and 30,000 over its first fifteen days.

World's Biggest flag
After raising $35,000 in raffles and donations, on 12 April 2011 Peñarol fans unveiled the largest flag ever unfurled in a stadium up to that moment. Nacional unfurled a bigger one years later that covered three stands of the stadium.
In 2013, Club Nacional de Football displayed a flag which was 600 metres long by 50 metres wide. This is now the world's biggest flag.

Players

First-team squad

Out on loan

Noted players

Néstor Gonçalves has the most official games in the club's history (571 matches), between 28 April 1957 and 28 November 1970. The team's all-time top scorers in the Primera División are Fernando Morena (203), Alberto Spencer (113) and Óscar Míguez (107). Morena's (whose 230 goals—203 with Peñarol and 27 with River Plate—make him the highest-scoring player in the Uruguayan League) 440 goals with Peñarol are a record as well. He scored the most goals in a single Uruguayan season (36 in 1978), and is the club's second-best goal scorer in international competition with 37 goals (behind Alberto Spencer, who scored 58 goals between 1960 and 1970). Spencer and Morena are the top scorers in Copa Libertadores history, with 48 and 37 goals respectively for Peñarol.

Peñarol has made a large contribution to the Uruguay national football team. Three Peñarol players were on the Uruguayan team which played Argentina in 1905. Five Peñarol players were on the Uruguayan squad which won the 1930 FIFA World Cup: goalkeeper Miguel Capuccini, defender Peregrino Anselmo and midfielders Lorenzo Fernández, Álvaro Gestido and Carlos Riolfo. Peñarol had nine players on the Uruguayan squad which won the 1950 FIFA World Cup: goalkeeper Roque Máspoli, defenders Juan Carlos González and Washington Ortuño, midfielders Juan Alberto Schiaffino and Obdulio Varela and forwards Ernesto Vidal, Julio César Britos, Óscar Míguez and Alcides Ghiggia. Schiaffino and Ghiggia scored the team's two goals in the Maracanazo, the final game against Brasil. Peñarol is the only club which has represented Uruguay in all its World Cup appearances.

Managers

While there is no hard information about managers in the amateur era of Uruguayan football, Peñarol has had a total of 62 coaches during its professional era. The first manager was Leonardo de Luca, who coached the team for two years and won the Uruguayan Championship (the first professional tournament in Uruguay) in 1932.

Of these 62 managers, 53 were Uruguayan; two were Hungarian (Emérico Hirschl and Béla Guttmann), two British (John Harley and Randolph Galloway), one Serbian (Ljupko Petrović), two Brazilian (Osvaldo Brandão and Dino Sani), one from Chile (Mario Tuane) and two from Argentina (Jorge Kistenmacher and César Luis Menotti).

Hugo Bagnulo and Gregorio Pérez have coached Peñarol the longest, leading the first team for eight seasons: Bagnulo for four stints and Pérez for five. Athuel Velásquez had the longest uninterrupted coaching period for Peñarol (five straight years, between 1935 and 1940). Bagnulo has the most Uruguayan championships (five); Pérez and Velásquez follow, with four each. In international competition Roberto Scarone was the most successful manager, winning two Copa Libertadores and an Intercontinental Cup with Peñarol.

Professional-era managers 
Caretaker managers in italics

 Leonardo de Luca (1932–34)
 José Piendibene (1934)
 Athuel Velásquez (1935–40)
 José Piendibene (1940–41)
 Leonardo de Luca (1941)
 Luis Manuel Morquio (1941)
 Lorenzo Fernández (1941–42)
 John Harley (1942)
 Leonardo de Luca (1942–43)
 Juan Pedro Arremón (1943)
 Pedro de Hegedüs (1943)
 Aníbal Tejada (1944)
 Alberto Suppici (1945)
 Aníbal Tejada (1946)
 Jorge Clulow (1947)
 Randolph Galloway (1948)
 Emérico Hirschl (1949–51)
 Juan López (1952–55)
 Roque Máspoli and Obdulio Varela (1955–55)
 Emérico Hirschl (1956)
 Gerardo Spósito (1957)
 Hugo Bagnulo (1958–59)
 Roberto Scarone (1959–61)
 Béla Guttmann (1962)
 Pelegrín Anselmo (1962)
 Roque Máspoli (1963–67)
 Rafael Milans (1968–69)
 Osvaldo Brandão (1969–70)
 Roque Máspoli (1970–71)
 Juan Eduardo Hohberg (1971)
 Ondino Viera (1972)
 Juan Ricardo Faccio (1972–73)
 Hugo Bagnulo (1973–74)
 José María Rodríguez (1974)
 Hugo Bagnulo (1974–75)
 Juan Alberto Schiaffino (1975–76)
 Roque Máspoli (1976)
 Dino Sani (1977–80)
 Mario Tuane (1980)
 Luis Prais (1980)
 José Etchegoyen (1980)
 Jorge Kistenmacher (1980)
 Alcides Ghiggia (1980)
 Luis Cubilla (1981)
 Hugo Bagnulo (1982–83)
 Osvaldo Balseiro (1983)
 Hugo Fernández (1984)
 César Luis Menotti (1984–85)
 Roque Máspoli (1985–86)
 Ramón Silva (1986)
 Óscar Tabárez (1987)
 Fernando Morena (1988)
 Roque Máspoli (1988)
 Ladislao Mazurkiewicz (1988–89)
 Walter Roque (1989)
 Roberto Fleitas (1989–90)
 César Luis Menotti (1990–91)
 Juan Duarte (1991)
 Ricardo "Tato" Ortiz (1991–92)
 Ljupko Petrović (1992)
 Roque Máspoli (1992)
 Walter Olivera (1992)
 Juan Ricardo Faccio (1992)
 Gregorio Pérez (1993–95)
 Jorge Fossati (1996)
 Alejandro Botello (1996)
 Gregorio Pérez (1997–98)
 Julio Ribas (1999–01)
 Gregorio Pérez (2002)
 Diego Aguirre (2003–05)
 Fernando Morena (2005)
 Luis Garisto (2006)
 Mario Saralegui (24 April 2006 – 30 June 2006)
 Gregorio Pérez (15 July 2006 – 30 June 2007)
 Gustavo Matosas (2007)
 Mario Saralegui (11 March 2008 – 19 January 2009)
 Julio Ribas (20 January 2009 – 14 September 2009)
 Víctor Púa (14 September 2009 – 14 December 2009)
 Diego Aguirre (7 December 2009 – 6 June 2010)
 Manuel Keosseian (1 July 2010 – 23 November 2010)
 Edison Machín (2010)
 Diego Aguirre (7 December 2010 – 6 September 2011)
 Gregorio Pérez (6 September 2011 – 27 February 2012)
 Jorge Gonçalves (27 February 2012 – 1 March 2012)
 Jorge da Silva (1 March 2012 – 30 June 2013)
 Diego Alonso (19 June 2013 – 6 October 2013)
 Jorge Gonçalves (7 October 2013 – 28 January 2014)
 Jorge Fossati (28 January 2014–14)
 Paolo Montero (2014–15)
 Pablo Bengoechea (2015–16)
 Jorge da Silva (2016–October 2016)
 Fernando Curutchet (October 2016-December 2016)
 Leonardo Ramos (December 2016 - June 2018)
 Diego López (June 2018 – December 2019)
 Diego Forlán (January 2020 – September 2020)
 Mario Saralegui (September 2020 – December 2020)
 Mauricio Larriera (December 2020 – present)

Current staff
Coach: Mauricio Larriera
Assistant coaches: Dario Rodriguez
Trainers: Eduardo Del Capellán
Goalkeepers' Coach: Óscar Ferro
Fitness coach: Alejandro Valenzuela
Assistant fitness coach: Sebastián Roquero
Head of medical department: Edgardo Rienzi
Club Doctor: Horacio Deccia
Nurses: Miguel Domínguez, Fernando Robaina
Kinesiologists: Marcos Sosa, Mauricio Velázquez
Equipier: Miguel Santos
Props man: Germán Pellejero

Administration

During a meeting presided over by Roland Moor on 28 September 1891, it was stipulated that responsibility for the Central Uruguay Railway Cricket Club would belong to the principal administrator of the Central Uruguay Railway Company of Montevideo. The first president of the club was Frank Henderson, who remained in that office until 1899.

After Henderson CUR administrators remained as chairmen of the sports club until 1906, when Charles W. Bayne took over the CUR. Bayne refused to sponsor the CURCC because of vandalism by fans and absenteeism by workers. He was replaced by CUR employee Roland Moor.

Conflicts remained between the company and the sports club, which resulted in the separation of CURCC's football section from the company and a name change to Club Atlético Peñarol. Jorge Clulow, an Englishman with Uruguayan nationality, was chosen chairman of the club; he remained in office from 1914 to 1915.

Presidents

 1891–99: Frank Henderson
 1899–05: Frank Hudson
 1906–08: Roland C.J. Moor
 1909–13: Percy Sedgfield
 1914–15: Jorge H. Clulow
 1916–17: Francisco Simón
 1918: Félix Polleri
 1919: César Batlle Pacheco
 1920: Félix Polleri
 1921–28: Julio María Sosa
 1929: Arturo Abella
 1930–31: Luis Giorgi
 1932: Juan Antonio Scasso
 1933–34: Alberto Demicheli
 1934: Pedro Viapina
 1935–36: Luis Giorgi
 1937: Francisco Tochetti
 1938: Alberto Mantrana Garín
 1939: Eduardo Alliaume
 1940: Francisco Tochetti
 1941–42: Bolívar Baliñas
 1942: Álvaro Macedo
 1943: Armando Lerma
 1944–48: Constante Turturiello
 1949–51: Eduardo Alliaume
 1952–55: José Buzzetti
 1956: Raúl Previtali
 1957: Eduardo Alliaume
 1958–72: Gastón Guelfi
 1973–84: Washington Cataldi
 1985–86: Carlos José Lecueder
 1987–90: José Pedro Damiani
 1991–92: Washington Cataldi
 1993–07: José Pedro Damiani
 2008–2017: Juan Pedro Damiani
 2017-2020: Jorge Barrera 
 2020- : Juan Ignacio Ruglio
Honorary
 1929: Julio María Sosa
 1938: Francisco Tochetti
 1949: Constante Turturiello
 1953: Mantrana Garin
 1953: Carlos Balsán
 1961: Gastón Guelfi
 1978: Washington Cataldi
 1991: José Pedro Damiani
 Julio María Sanguinetti

Board members 2020–2023

Statistics

Peñarol played 26 seasons of the Uruguay Association Football League, from its creation in 1900 until the end of the amateur era in 1931 (absent 1923–26, when the club was disaffiliated from the AUF). During this period Peñarol won the Uruguayan Championship nine times, with its best years in 1900 and 1905 (when the club won the championship without conceding any points). Peñarol was undefeated in 1901, 1903 and 1907. Its worst year was 1908; the team left the league after ten games, forfeiting the other eight. Peñarol's largest goal difference in a game during its amateur era was in 1903, when they defeated Triunfo 12–0.

The club placed second in 1923 (when they scored a record 100 goals), and won in 1924; its most impressive victory was a 10–0 win over Roberto Cherry during the cancelled 1925 season. Both tournaments were organised by dissident body Uruguayan Football Federation (FUF).

Since the beginning of the professional era in 1932, Peñarol and Nacional are the only teams who have played every season for the Uruguayan championship. Peñarol has the most Uruguayan League titles (winning 38 times between 1932 and 2013) and the greatest number of undefeated championships (1949, 1954, 1964, 1967, 1968, 1975 and 1978). Its best performances were in 1949 and 1964, seasons when the team scored 94.44 percent of possible points; its worst season was 2005–06, when it finished in 16th place after winning 32.32 percent of possible points. A 12-point deduction given the team by the AUF because of unrest after a game with Cerro relegated them to that position.

Peñarol's best victory was a 9–0 win against Rampla Juniors in 1962; its worst defeat was 0–6 against Nacional. On the international scene, its best result was an 11–2 win over Valencia of Venezuela on 15 March 1970; its worst was against Olimpia of Paraguay, a 0–6 loss on 10 December 1990 during the Supercopa Sudamericana.

Peñarol holds a number of national and international records. The club has the longest undefeated run in the Uruguayan league: 56 games, from 3 September 1966 to 14 September 1968. This is also the longest undefeated run in South American professional football (second place if amateur leagues are counted).

It was the first club to win the Copa Libertadores de América undefeated, in 1960. Peñarol has the greatest number of appearances in the Copa Libertadores (40), and the most appearances in the finals (10). The club holds the record for the biggest win (11–2 against Valencia), and the biggest goal difference in a two-legged elimination (defeating Everest from Ecuador 5–0 and 9–1). Peñarol is one of the teams with five Intercontinental Cup appearances, the first to reach that number.

Honours

National
 Primera División (AUF) (51): 1900, 1901, 1905, 1907, 1911; 1918, 1921, 1928, 1929, 1932, 1935, 1936, 1937, 1938, 1944, 1945, 1949, 1951, 1953, 1954, 1958, 1959, 1960, 1961, 1962, 1964, 1965, 1967, 1968, 1973, 1974, 1975, 1978, 1979, 1981, 1982, 1985, 1986, 1993, 1994, 1995, 1996, 1997, 1999, 2003, 2009–10, 2012–13, 2015–16, 2017, 2018, 2021
 Primera División (FUF/CP) (2): 1924 FUF, 1926 CP 
 Supercopa Uruguaya (2): 2018, 2022
Copa Albion de Caridad (3): 1916, 1917, 1921
Copa de Honor (4): 1907, 1909, 1911, 1918
Liga Mayor (1): 1978

International

 Intercontinental Cup (3): 1961, 1966, 1982
 Copa Libertadores (5): 1960, 1961, 1966, 1982, 1987
 Intercontinental Champions' Supercup (1): 1969
 Copa de Honor Cousenier (AFA/AUF) (3): 1909, 1911, 1918
 Tie Cup (AFA/AUF) (1): 1916
 Copa Aldao (AFA/AUF) (1): 1928
 IFA Shield (IFA) (1): 1985

Youth tournaments
 U-20 Copa Libertadores (1): 2022

South American Club of the Century

In 2009, the International Federation of Football History & Statistics released a list of the best clubs of the 20th century on each continent. The organization awarded points for each victory in a quarterfinal or higher in international competition but only took into account games played after 1932 for the Professional era. Peñarol was the number-one team in South America, above Independiente of Argentina and arch-rivals Nacional.

Other sports

Basketball

Peñarol's basketball records date back to the late 1920s, when Club Piratas was formed; in 1931, it became Peñarol. Its first league game (in the fourth division of Uruguayan basketball) was played in 1940. By 1943 the team, playing in the first division for Ramón Esnal, finished third. The following year Peñarol won the Federal Championship, a tournament attracting the best basketball teams in Montevideo; in 2003, the league changed its name to Liga Uruguaya de Basketball.

In 1945, Peñarol jumped from the Uruguayan Basketball Federation to play in a new league; when the upstart league failed, the club rejoined the federation in 1947. In 1952 Peñarol again won the Federal Championship, winning the Winter Tournament in 1953 and 1955. After a low period (with relegation in 1968), Peñarol won the Uruguayan Championship in 1973, 1978, and 1979;the latter was the first professional tournament in league history. In 1982 the club enjoyed its most successful season, winning the Federal Championship and the Winter Tournament The club also won the Campeonato Sudamericano de Clubes in 1983. In 1985 the club was relegated, beginning a downward spiral which ended with its expulsion from the league in 1997. However, the club rejoined in 2018 the Federación Uruguaya de Basket Ball, in the third tier.

Cycling
Peñarol has participated in the Vuelta Ciclista del Uruguay (Tour of Uruguay) since it began in 1939. Although the team rode well during its early years, it was not until the ninth edition (in 1952) that a Peñarol cyclist would win the race (Dante Sudatti, with an overall time of 48 hours, 38 minutes and 38 seconds). Peñarol cyclists also won the general classification 1953 and 1956; in the latter year, the club won the team championship.

After again winning the team championship in 1959, Peñarol would only win one individual championship in 1964. The team later improved, winning three individual titles in a row from 1989 to 1991 and the team victory in 1990 and 1991. 2002 was the fourth year that the club won both the individual and team classifications. Peñarol has competed in other road races, including José María Orlando's 1990 victory in the Rutas de América.

Futsal
Peñarol began playing futsal in 1968. During its first two decades, the club won on the national and international levels (including a victory in the 1987 World Interclub Championship). In 1995 FIFA took over the sport, and Peñarol began competing in AUF tournaments. The team won the first three Uruguayan Championships (1995, 1996, and 1997), also finishing at the top in 1999 and 2004. It won another three consecutive tournaments in 2010, 2011 and 2012.

Beach soccer
In January 2013 Peñarol inaugurated its beach soccer section. Diego Monserrat, goalkeeper of the Uruguay national team for many years, was the institution's first coach in this sport, while also goalkeeper Felipe Fernández was the club's first captain. In the second half of the same month, Peñarol won one of the three groups of five teams, that formed the qualification tournament to the "Super Liga", name given to the Uruguayan Championship of the discipline. After victories on quarterfinals and semi-finals, Peñarol was declared champion of the tournament without the need of a final, after the other semi-final was suspended.

Rugby

Peñarol have announced that they will form a rugby union section to compete in the inaugural 2020 season of the Superliga Americana de Rugby, to be start in February 2020. Peñarol Rugby will be the only representative of Uruguay at the competition.

Peñarol Rugby was the Champion of the 2022 Súper Liga Americana de Rugby season.

Esports 
Peñarol also has a esports division, with squads competing in League of Legends and FIFA leagues organized by the Uruguayan Virtual Football Association.

Notes

References

External links

  
 C.A. Peñarol profile at FIFA.com

 
1891 establishments in Uruguay
Association football clubs established in 1891
Football clubs in Uruguay
Unrelegated association football clubs
Railway association football teams
Esports teams based in Uruguay
Copa Libertadores winning clubs
Intercontinental Cup winning clubs